The Premier League Playmaker of the Season is an annual English football award, presented to the player who has made the most assists (the last pass made before a goal scored) in the Premier League. For sponsorship purposes, it was called the Cadbury Playmaker of the Season between its inception during the 2017–18 season and 2019–20 season. For the 2020–21 season, it was known as the Coca-Cola Zero Sugar Playmaker of the Season; in the following season it is known as the Castrol Playmaker of the Season.

In 2018, the Premier League Playmaker of the Season was first awarded, with Kevin De Bruyne of Manchester City its inaugural recipient.

Winners

Awards won by nationality

Awards won by club

See also

 Premier League Golden Boot
 Premier League Golden Glove

References

Assists
Premier League trophies and awards
Association football top assist provider awards
Association football player non-biographical articles